América, Esta es tu canción ("America, this is your song") is a recompilation of songs from contest show of the same name, guided by Raúl Velasco.  The first edition was released on 1982.

Track listing
 América, Ésta Es Tu Canción by Lucerito
 Canarinho Dobrador
 En Una Nube
 La Gata Coqueta
 La Pulga
 Queremos Crecer Y Vivir
 La Gallina Tutu
 Quisiera Ser
 A Manejar
 Mi Casita Interiorana
 El Abuelito
 A Dónde Van Los Niños
 Puerto Rico
 En Mi Mundo De Juguete
 Vuelve Papá
 La Patineta y Papá
 Popurrí Mexicano

1982 albums
Compilation album series